Starsky & Hutch is a 2004 American buddy cop action comedy film directed by Todd Phillips. The film stars Ben Stiller as David Starsky and Owen Wilson as Ken "Hutch" Hutchinson and is a film adaptation of the original television series of the same name from the 1970s.

Two streetwise undercover cops in the fictional city of Bay City, California in 1975 bust drug criminals with the help of underworld boss Huggy Bear. The film is a prequel to the television series, as it portrays Starsky and Hutch being first partnered. The film also switches the personalities of the title characters. While in the television show, Starsky was curious and streetwise, and Hutch was by-the-book, in the film, Starsky is the serious cop, and Hutch is laid-back. There are four Frat Pack members in this film, although not all are in major roles.

The film was released on March 5, 2004, received mixed to positive reviews from critics and was commercially successful, earning $170 million worldwide on a $60 million budget.

Plot
In 1975, two Bay City Police detectives, the macho David Starsky (who loves his Ford Torino and recklessly pursues minor offenders) and the easy-going Ken "Hutch" Hutchinson (who often works alongside criminals to investigate their activity) are forced to become partners as punishment for recent antics. Meanwhile, Jewish-American drug kingpin Reese Feldman and his right-hand man Kevin Jutsum develop a new type of cocaine that is untraceable in scent and taste. When one of his dealers botches an operation, Feldman kills him.

The body washes ashore a few days later, and Starsky and Hutch investigate the scene. A clue leads them to Feldman, who denies any knowledge of the crime, but his wife mentions the dealer had been dating a cheerleader. After meeting cheerleaders Stacey and Holly, the detectives are given a jacket from cheerleader Heather. Their street-wise informant Huggy Bear directs the pair to Big Earl's motorcycle bar. Disguised as "Captain America" and "Billy" from Easy Rider, Starsky and Hutch learn that Big Earl is in jail, where they question him on his connection to Feldman's illicit dealings; Big Earl forces the detectives into humiliating acts in exchange for information and a packet of what they believe is cocaine. However, Captain Doby, angered by their wild interrogation, dismisses their packet as nothing more than artificial sweetener and takes them off the case.

The duo invite Stacey and Holly to Starsky's place where Starsky puts the “sweetener” in his coffee while Hutch sings "Don't Give Up on Us". The four visit a disco where Starsky, suffering the effects what proves to be Feldman's modified cocaine, loses a dance-off. Hutch takes him home and puts him to bed, then proceeds to have a threesome with Stacey and Holly.

The duo are then assaulted by an Asian dealer and his knife-wielding son, working for Feldman. After an interrogation, they deduce that Feldman stores the drugs in his garage. They go undercover as mimes at his daughter's Bat Mitzvah; confronting Feldman, Starsky shoots the lock off his garage door, inadvertently killing a pony inside that had been a gift for his daughter. Feldman exonerates them, figuring the botched operation will take heat off him, but Doby indefinitely suspends both detectives, and though Starsky defends Hutch, Doby reveals a complaint Starsky filed against Hutch weeks ago. Starsky tries to explain himself to Hutch, but an argument leads to a split in their friendship.

A bomb meant for Hutch instead injures his young neighbor Willis. Visiting him in the hospital, Starsky and Hutch reconcile and decide to shut down Feldman's drug business. Aided by Huggy Bear, who grudgingly serves as Feldman's golf caddie, they learn that Feldman plans to sell the drugs at a charity ball by hiding them in Volkswagen Karmann Ghias to be given away to other dealers.

The duo enter the party in disguise with Stacey and Holly as their dates. Deducing Feldman's plan, they shoot open a VW's trunk, revealing the large stash of cocaine. Feldman takes Hutch hostage, and Starsky, attempting to rescue him, accidentally shoots Captain Doby in the shoulder, though Hutch declares Reese was responsible. In the confusion, Feldman and his girlfriend Kitty escape with the money from the cocaine deal, leading Starsky and Hutch on a car chase through a golf course.

As Feldman and Kitty take off in his yacht, Starsky and Hutch try to ramp Starsky's Torino off a pier in pursuit, but jumps way off course and lands in the sea. The two manage to escape to safety. Meanwhile, Huggy, hiding on board, knocks Feldman out with a golf club that Feldman had accused him of losing, and takes one of Feldman's money briefcases for himself.

Celebrating the capture of Feldman, Jutsum, and Kitty, Starsky mourns the loss of his car. Huggy surprises him with another Gran Torino (bought from the original Starsky and Hutch duo, David Soul and Paul Michael Glaser). The two partners roll out on another case in their new ride.

Cast

 Ben Stiller as Detective David Starsky
 Owen Wilson as Detective Ken "Hutch" Hutchinson
 Vince Vaughn as Mr. Reese Feldman
 Snoop Dogg as Huggy Bear Brown
 Jason Bateman as Kevin Jutsum
 Fred Williamson as Captain Doby
 Carmen Electra as Stacey Haack
 Amy Smart as Holly Monk
 Juliette Lewis as Kitty
 Molly Sims as Mrs. Feldman
 George Cheung as Chau
 Chris Penn as Manetti
 Terry Crews as Porter
 Brande Roderick as Heather
 Jeffrey Lorenzo as Willis Lewis
 Har Mar Superstar as Dancing Rick
 Patton Oswalt as Disco DJ
 Paul Michael Glaser as Original Starsky
 David Soul as Original Hutch
 Will Ferrell as Big Earl Drennan (uncredited)

Reception
On Rotten Tomatoes the film has an approval rating of 62% based on 193 reviews, with an average rating of 6/10. The website's critical consensus reads: "It's uneven and occasionally somewhat aimless, but Starsky & Hutch benefits from Stiller and Wilson's chemistry and a surprisingly warm-hearted script". On Metacritic the film earned a weighted average score of 55 out of 100 based on 40 reviews, indicating "mixed or average reviews". Audiences surveyed by CinemaScore gave the film a grade B on scale of A to F.

Roger Ebert awarded it 3 out of 4 stars. Ebert called it "a surprisingly funny movie, the best of the 1970s recycling jobs, with one laugh ("Are you OK, little pony?") almost as funny as the moment in Dumb and Dumber when the kid figured out his parakeet's head was Scotch-taped on".
Brian Lowry of Variety magazine wrote: "Blessed with sporadic moments of cheeky fun, isn't painful but seldom advances beyond costumes and hairstyling in terms of creativity".

Ben Stiller earned a Golden Raspberry Award nomination for Worst Actor. Carmen Electra earned a nomination for Worst Supporting Actress.

Box office
In the film's opening weekend, it grossed $28,103,367 in 3,185 theaters. Starsky & Hutch has had gross receipts of $88,237,754 in the U.S. and Canada and $82,030,996 in international markets for a total of $170,268,750 worldwide.

References

External links

 
 

Starsky & Hutch
2004 films
2004 action comedy films
2000s buddy comedy films
2000s buddy cop films
2000s crime comedy films
American action comedy films
American buddy cop films
American crime comedy films
Dimension Films films
Films based on television series
Films directed by Todd Phillips
Films produced by Akiva Goldsman
Films set in 1975
Films set in California
Films set in Los Angeles
Films shot in Los Angeles
Red Hour Productions films
American buddy comedy films
Warner Bros. films
Films with screenplays by Todd Phillips
Films scored by Theodore Shapiro
2004 comedy films
2000s English-language films
2000s American films
American prequel films